Pego is a municipality located in the province of Alicante, Spain.

Lying just inland from the northern Costa Blanca resort of Dénia, the town of Pego sits in a depression, surrounded by mountains. A part of the Marina Alta comarca of Alicante, Pego has a population of 10,721 (2006) and a history dating from the Arab occupation.
The region around Pego was settled during the Bronze Age and later by Iberian and Roman civilizations, though the story of the town really begins during the times of the Moors in around 726, when Pego was an important Arab enclave which later formed part of the Taifa of Dénia. Subsequently, conquered by forces under James I of Aragon in 1244, Pego was later repopulated with peasants from Catalonia and the barony of Pego was created in 1262, and control of the town passed through the hands of various members of the Valencian nobility.

History
During the late 13th century the wetlands between Pego and Oliva were developed for the production of rice, fishing and grazing, rice in particular became an important source of income, though later rice production in the wetlands was banned by Martin I (1403) and attempts were made to regulate the cultivation of the wetlands. The final expulsion of remaining moriscos (Moors converted to Christianity) occurred in 1609 and Pego became virtually deserted for some time.

In the late 18th century certain areas of the wetlands were further developed, beginning with the formation of drainage ditches in the outer sections, though rice production did not return until 1805 when a Royal Order allowed the crop to be grown once more, significant areas were transformed between 1820 and 1840 though much of the wetlands remained untouched. The cultivation of rice continued to increase and by 1901 382 hectares were dedicated to rice production, this reached a high of 900 hectares in 1945.
During Moorish times Pego was of course a walled town, with the obligatory castle, after the reconquest these fortifications were extended and had in all 16 towers, most of this was destroyed during the War of Spanish Succession (1701–14). There are still some remains of the wall, these can be found in the Old Town where the medieval streets still retain much of their original charm.

Main sights
Worth visiting in Pego are the Arciprestal Church of Our Lady of the Assumption (16th century) built in the Renaissance style, built on the ruins of an earlier church, the Chapel of Ecce Homo (18th century) in the Baroque style and designed by the Valencian architect Fray Francisco Cabezas, the Church of the Sagrada Família, the hermitage of San José (19th century), the hermitage of San Miguel (17th century), the Castillo de Ambra (Castle Ambra) thought to originate from the early 13th century and the Parque Natural de la Marjal de Pego-Oliva (Natural Park of the Pego-Oliva Marshes).

Culture
Pego celebrates a number of fiestas and festivals throughout the year and these include the Moors and Christians (late June), Porrat de Sant Antoni del Porquet (January), Carnival  and the Pinyata (burial of the sardine).

Some typical local dishes include "Crosta" (rice baked in the oven with pork parts), botifarra (blood and onion sausage), chick peas and beaten eggs (baked on top at the end), "arros caldos" (soupy rice with beans, turnips, chicken, and pork) and paella with land snails and rabbit and many other varieties of paella. Tapas such as "pichinettes" (colorful tiny freshly caught clams sautéed in EVO with tomato, onion and lemon). "Caragols" land snails sautéed in tomato, tortilla shells with various speciality fillings such as tiny shrimp from the local river.

Pego is situated on the CV-715 just inland from Denia and Oliva.

Weather - Pego enjoys a pleasant Mediterranean climate with hot, dry summers and mild winters.

Demographic population

References

External links
 

Municipalities in the Province of Alicante
Marina Alta